Risida Kandhapara is a small village in Kalahandi district, Odisha state, India.  the 2011 Census of India, it had a population of 1,151	across 310 households.

References 

Villages in Kalahandi district